Alain de Martigny (born 9 April 1946) is a French football manager and former player.

He played for Cambrai, Lille and Brest.

He coached Brest, RC Paris, the Gabon national team, AS Sogara, Guingamp, Angers and Meaux.

References

1946 births
Living people
French footballers
Association football midfielders
Lille OSC players
Stade Brestois 29 players
French football managers
Stade Brestois 29 managers
Angers SCO managers
En Avant Guingamp managers
Footballers from Paris
Racing Club de France Football managers
Gabon national football team managers